The men's 800 metres event at the 1973 Summer Universiade was held at the Central Lenin Stadium in Moscow on 16, 17 and 18 August.

Medalists

Results

Heats

Semifinals

Final

References

Athletics at the 1973 Summer Universiade
1973